Academy of Management Perspectives is a peer-reviewed academic journal published by the Academy of Management. It covers issues concerning management and business. According to the Journal Citation Reports, the journal's 2020 impact factor is 7.846, ranking it 27th out of 153 journals in the "Business" category and 27th out of 226 journals in the "Management" category. Current editors-in-chief are  Gideon D. Markman (Colorado State University) and Geoffrey Wood (Western University). The journal is indexed in Scopus.

References

External links 
 

Business and management journals
Publications established in 1987
Quarterly journals
English-language journals